George Southcote may refer to:

George Southcote (died 1589), MP for Tavistock
George Southcote (died 1638) (1572–1638), MP for Plympton Erle
Sir George Southcote, 1st Baronet (died 1663) of the Southcote baronets
Sir George Southcote, 2nd Baronet (1664–1680) of the Southcote baronets

See also
Southcote (disambiguation)